Kashū or Kashu may refer to:

 Kashū (poetry), a type of Japanese poetry anthology
 Another name for Kawachi Province
 Another name for Kaga Province

ja:加州
zh:加州 (消歧義)